The 1921 Boston University football team was an American football team that represented Boston University as an independent during the 1921 college football season. In its first season under head coach Charles Whelan, the team compiled a 6–2 record and outscored opponents by a total of 115 to 44.

Schedule

References

Boston University
Boston University Terriers football seasons
Boston University football